Happy Talk (also issued as Sweet Soul) is an album by organist Shirley Scott recorded in 1962 and released on the Prestige label.

Reception
The Allmusic review stated "It includes a nice "Jitterbug Waltz." All are standards".

Track listing 
 "Happy Talk" (Oscar Hammerstein II, Richard Rodgers) - 8:40 
 "Jitterbug Waltz" (Fats Waller) - 5:40  
 "I Hear a Rhapsody" (Jack Baker, George Fragos, Dick Gasparre) - 4:50
 "My Romance" (Lorenz Hart, Richard Rodgers) - 5:15  
 "Where or When" (Hart, Rodgers) - 4:50  
 "Sweet Slumber" (Lucky Millinder) - 5:15

Personnel 
 Shirley Scott - organ
 Earl May - bass
 Roy Brooks - drums

References 

1963 albums
Albums produced by Ozzie Cadena
Albums recorded at Van Gelder Studio
Prestige Records albums
Shirley Scott albums